Raheen is a large suburb of Limerick, Ireland. Initially developed to ease population overspill from the city of Limerick, Raheen is socioeconomically diverse, ranging from older, poor-class housing estates to relatively affluent areas.

History
The oldest parts of the area were built in the 1960s and 1970s. In the following years, Raheen and neighbouring Dooradoyle both experienced growth, particularly during the Celtic Tiger. Raheen became one of Limerick's more multicultural areas, as it was a common destination for immigrants. It has for a long time contained notable populations of Jewish, South Asian and Chinese descent, with a large influx of immigrants from Eastern Europe arriving during Ireland's economic boom.

Until 2014, Raheen, as with many other large Limerick city suburbs, was outside the boundary of Limerick City Council. Local government was under the jurisdiction of Limerick County Council, itself a separate authority to the city council with responsibility towards County Limerick. June 2014 saw the merger of the Limerick authorities into one unified authority. The merger saw the expansion of the city boundaries to include Raheen. Limerick City Council made many attempts in the past to extend its control over these parts of the city but were unsuccessful as part of a boundary extension to the city council area.

Economy
The local economy is highly dependent on light and heavy industry based at Raheen Business Park. It is the home of many international companies, and multi-national concerns with premises there including Regeneron Pharmaceuticals, Analog Devices, Dell, Banta, ON Semiconductor, Stryker Corp. (formerly Howmedica), RRD GTS, and Emutex. The Dell manufacturing plant was one of the largest employers in Limerick before its closure in January 2009, which dealt a major blow to the economy of the greater Limerick area. The former Dell plant has since been taken over by Regeneron.

The radio station Spin South West and an Irish National Training and Employment Authority centre (formerly FÁS) operate from the Raheen Industrial Estate. The Industrial Estate Estate is divided into two sections, the old section entrance is on the Raheen Roundabout (R526 St Nessan Road and R510) the Second Entrance is on the New Section with its entrance on the M20

Amenities
Raheen shares many amenities with neighbouring Dooradoyle, including the Crescent Shopping Centre and the main campus of University Hospital Limerick. There are many shops and restaurants located in Raheen proper, along with St Nessan's (Roman Catholic) Church.

The main school in the area is St Nessan's NS, a primary school. Many secondary-level students from Raheen are educated at Crescent College in Dooradoyle, while others attend schools further afield in Limerick city or county.

Transport
Parts of Raheen are serviced by two different city bus routes. The 301 bus (Westbury-City Centre-Raheen) stops on Father Russell Road near Oakfield, while the 304 bus (University of Limerick-City Centre-Ballycummin) serves St Nessan's Road, Church Hill Meadows, and Raheen Heights.

The R526 runs through Raheen into Limerick City Centre. National road N69 starts in the area, linking it to Tralee, Co.Kerry, as well as the N18 linking Limerick to nearby Shannon Airport and further on to Ennis, Co.Clare and Galway City. 

Raheen also hosts exits to the M20 and M7 motorways, linking Limerick city to Cork and Dublin.

References

Towns and villages in County Limerick